Scartella itajobi is a species of combtooth blenny found in the Atlantic ocean.  This species reaches a length of  SL.

References

itajobi
Fish described in 2009